The Pula Fund is the sovereign wealth fund of Botswana. , the fund had US$4.1 billion in assets under management.

History 
The Pula Fund was established in November 1993, to invest surplus revenues from diamond exports.

In 1997, the fund was re-established in its current form, under the Bank of Botswana Act 1996 with the objective of providing greater flexibility in the management of international reserves, and greater certainty in the forecasting of annual “dividend” payments to the government from the Bank of Botswana.

In 2008, the fund agreed to the Santiago Principles, a series of guidelines on best practices for sovereign wealth funds.

As of 2015, the fund has assets valued at $7 billion.

Prior to May 2019, the fund was restricted to investing in United States dollars, Pound sterling, Japanese yen, and euros. In May 2019, the Bank of Botswana eased these restrictions, increasing the number of eligible currencies to 17.

In July 2020, the Bank of Botswana announced it would be seeking legislation to limit access to the fund, as the fund was being accessed by governments to meet budget deficits, leading to a steady fall in the fund's reserves.

See also 

 List of countries by sovereign wealth funds
 Economy of Botswana
Mining industry of Botswana

References 

Sovereign wealth funds
1993 establishments in Botswana